J. P. Machado (born January 6, 1976) is a former professional American football player who played offensive guard for five seasons for the New York Jets.

References

External links
 New York Jets bio from the 2000 Jets Yearbook

1976 births
Living people
People from Monmouth, Illinois
Players of American football from Illinois
American football offensive guards
Illinois Fighting Illini football players
New York Jets players